Re-Stitch These Wounds is a commercial release by American rock band Black Veil Brides, through Sumerian Records. It is a re-recorded version of the band's first album, We Stitch These Wounds, to commemorate its 10th anniversary. Intended to be a "companion piece" to the first album rather than a "replacement", the band stated they "hope fans can enjoy and see the musical evolution of the band in a unique way." This is their first full-length studio album to feature Lonny Eagleton as bassist. Re-Stitch These Wounds was released on July 31, 2020.

Track listing

Personnel

Black Veil Brides
 Andy Biersack – lead vocals, piano
 Jake Pitts – lead guitar
 Jeremy "Jinxx" Ferguson – rhythm guitar, string arrangement, violin, cello, backing vocals
 Lonny Eagleton – bass, backing vocals
 Christian "CC" Coma – drums, percussion

Production
 Jake Pitts – production, engineering, digital editing, additional production, mixing

Artwork
 Luca Solo Macello – cover illustration

Charts

References

2020 albums
Black Veil Brides albums
Albums produced by Jake Pitts